Zoumajie Town is an urban town in Shuangfeng County, Hunan Province, People's Republic of China.

Administrative division
The town is divided into 70 villages and 1 community, the following areas: 
 
  Tangtuo Community
  Xiangquan Village
  Xianghua Village
  Jinbeng Village
  Jinping Village
  Yanyan Village
  Jinlong Village
  Shijian Village
  Longkou Village
  Maxian Village
  Quanshui Village
  Mishui Village
  Shuangwan Village
  Yintai Village
  Shichong Village
  Shitan Village
  Yangtan Village
  Gaochong Village
  Dayuan Village
  Shanshu Village
  Wanjia Village
  Wuyi Village
  Julun Village
  Quwan Village
  Fengshu Village
  Guantuo Village
  Baofeng Village
  Datang Village
  Daxing Village
  Tongyu Village
  Tongyi Village
  Shuikou Village
  Jianlou Village
  Tongfu Village
  Ya'an Village
  Xinpu Village
  Quanjing Village
  Qiutang Village
  Dama Village
  Zouma Village
  Tuotang Village
  Wanfu Village
  Hemin Village
  Songjia Village
  Jiangjun Village
  Jinlin Village
  Shixi Village
  Jiuxi Village
  Yangchong Village
  Dingxing Village
  Zengxin Village
  Tangxing Village
  Zhoujia Village
  Caishi Village
  Lixin Village
  Gutian Village
  Shimen Village
  Yifeng Village
  Fengxing Village
  Shantang Village
  Fanrong Village
  Xiabaiyang Village
  Xiashantang Village
  Baishu Village
  Shenshan Village
  Gaolou Village
  Jieping Village
  Jiaoqiao Village
  Jiaoxi Village
  Meishanping Village
  Meifeng Village 

Divisions of Shuangfeng County